The National Foundation on the Arts and the Humanities is an agency of the United States federal government that was established in 1965. Its purpose is to "develop and promote a broadly conceived national policy of support for the humanities and the arts in the United States, and for institutions which preserve the cultural heritage of the United States."

It is composed of four sub-agencies:
National Endowment for the Arts
National Endowment for the Humanities
Institute of Museum and Library Services
Federal Council on the Arts and the Humanities

Federal Council on the Arts and the Humanities
The Federal Council on the Arts and the Humanities has 19 members:
Chairman of the National Endowment for the Arts
Chairman of the National Endowment for the Humanities
Secretary of Education
Director of the National Science Foundation
Librarian of Congress
Chairman of the Commission of Fine Arts
Archivist of the United States
Commissioner of the Public Buildings Service of the General Services Administration
Administrator of the General Services Administration
Director of the United States Information Agency
Secretary of the Interior
Secretary of Commerce
Secretary of Transportation
Chairman of the National Museum Services Board
Director of the Institute of Museum and Library Services
Secretary of Housing and Urban Development
Secretary of Labor
Secretary of Veterans Affairs
Commissioner of the Administration on Aging

References

 
Government agencies established in 1965
Independent agencies of the United States government